Deutschtown Music Festival is an annual community music festival in Pittsburgh, Pennsylvania. The festival features over 35 stages and 400 bands performing across Deutschtown for which the festival is named. It is the largest free music festival in Pittsburgh and one of the largest free three-day music and arts festivals in America.

History

See also 
East Allegheny (Pittsburgh)

References

External links
 

Music festivals in Pennsylvania
Music festivals established in 2012
Rock festivals in the United States
Festivals in Pittsburgh